The M62 is a Soviet-built diesel locomotive for heavy freight trains, exported to many Eastern Bloc countries as well as to Cuba, North Korea and Mongolia. Beside the single locomotive M62 also twin versions 2M62 and three-section versions 3M62 have been built. A total number of 7,164 single sections have been produced, which have been used to build 5,231 single-, twin- and three-section locomotives.

History
According to the Comecon directives production of heavy diesel locomotives among Eastern Bloc countries was left exclusively to Romania and the Soviet Union. The M62 was developed by the Vorohsilovgrad Locomotive Factory (today: Luhansk Locomotive Factory) on order of Hungary. The M62 designation originates from the Hungarian order, as the Hungarian railways previously ordered Swedish locomotives called M61 in Hungary. The Soviets disliked this and forced Hungary to buy Soviet locomotives, but the USSR did not have suitable diesel locomotives at the time, spurring the development of the type. The first few prototypes of this heavy freight locomotive were ready in 1964 and the first buyer outside the Soviet Union was Hungary. A total number of 723 units were produced in the Soviet Union.

Operators

Soviet Union M62

Between 1970 and 1976 the Soviet Union Railway (SZhD) received 723 M62 engines, further 13 M62U units have been delivered between 1989 and 1990. These engines were single 3M62U sections.

For the Soviet military 154 locomotives named DM62 were built. These engines have been modified for pulling SS-24 Scalpel ballistic rocket launcher trains.

For industrial railroads 39 engines of the version M62UP have been built. These engines had improved trucks, larger fuel tanks and modified exhaust silencers.

Poland ST44

In the early 1960s an urgent need appeared in Poland for a heavy freight diesel locomotive. The Polish industry at the time was not able to produce such a locomotive, so a decision was made to import a large number of M62 locomotives from the Soviet Union, which were already imported by Hungarian MÁV. In Poland those machines received ST44 designation During first-revision repairs all locomotives had front lights changed from small ones into standard, Polish large types.
The decision is said to have been made after Poland had started to import ST43 locomotives from Romania and probably came directly from the Soviet Union. For political reasons, the Soviet Union simply forced Poland to buy Soviet instead of Romanian locomotives, as it preferred satellite countries not to export their products.

The first four locomotives, produced by the Voroshilovgrad Locomotive Factory (in today's Luhansk, Ukraine), were delivered to Poland in September 1965. Deliveries continued until 1988, with 1,191 locomotives delivered in total (1,114 for PKP standard-gauge network, 68 broad-gauge units for LHS and 9 for the industry). One of the locomotives (ST44-1500 – producer's designation M63) had newer bogies and traction engines, allowing it to reach a higher top speed. The broad-gauge units, numbered from 2001 to 2068, imported to run on the LHS, were equipped with an automatic coupling system.

There were several reasons for importing M62 locomotives to Poland, and today's views on this decision are quite ambiguous. The locomotive was more powerful than even the strongest of the Polish steam locomotives used for freight transport in those days, but it could not haul passenger trains due to it being not equipped to provide heating or power to carriages, it also caused extensive damage to railway tracks. Another important disadvantage of the M62 is its very high fuel consumption. The advantages of this machine though are a fairly simple construction coupled with a largely reliable diesel-electric transmission.
Intensive electrification of Polish railways caused the relatively new ST44 locomotives to be mothballed into reserve stock. Many machines withdrawn from PKP found their place among industrial and private railways, where they only bore the producer's M62 designation.

Present use

Heavy fuel and oil consumption as well as heavy wear caused to the tracks has resulted in Polish State Railways reducing the use of the class. In 2007 many of them still remain in service with PKP for freight use, although most of them have now been stored. Some routes (e.g. Gdynia–Hel line) forbid the running of the ST44 class because this class's excessive weight causes serious damage to lightly built track work.

The locomotives that are still in use in large numbers, are owned and operated by private railroad companies, as well as the LHS broad gauge line. Today around 50 of the class are located at Zamość depot, and it has been decided to mothball them for the moment.

In 2005, two ST44 locomotives were completely rebuilt by Bumar-Fablok S.A. and delivered to the LHS line. Changes made included new Caterpillar 3516B HD Diesel Engines and Primary Alternators. These locomotives were designated as 3001 and 3002.

Since 2007 Newag offers extensive modernisations of the M62 locomotives that involve the replacement of the prime mover and generator, fitting new drivers' cabs and new body. The modernised units bear the manufacturer's designation 311D (standard gauge) and 311Da (Russian gauge). Modernised units have been supplied to a number of operators in Poland, PKP Cargo classifies them as ST40 and PKP LHS – as ST40s.

In 2017 Polish train operator , in co-operation with VIS Systems, converted one ST44 to 3 kV DC electric. The company has converted another unit since and plans to convert 12 locomotives altogether.

North Korea K62

Because of its low maintenance requirements M62 locomotive is quite popular with the Korean State Railway of the North Korea, where they serve not only on non-electrified lines but on electrified ones as well. 64 locomotives of this type were imported from the Soviet Union and the Russian Federation between 1967 and 1995, numbered in the 내연6xx (Naeyŏn 6xx) series.

Between 1996 and 1998 31 locomotives were delivered from Deutsche Bahn. In 2000 six units were delivered from Slovak Railways and 13 units from Polish State Railways. None of the delivered locomotives were painted in standard North Korean livery (which is light blue over green) and they still bear the same livery as in previous service, except the former German ones, which were given a different, green livery. Those units acquired from Germany are numbered in the 내연7xx (Naeyŏn 7xx) series, while those acquired from Poland and Slovakia are numbered in the 내연8xx (Naeyŏn 8xx) series.

Locomotive Naeyŏn 602 has a special red tablet mounted on it that states that this machine was personally inspected by Kim Il-sung.

Two copies were built in North Korea, numbers 8001 and 8002, and given the designation “Kŭmsŏng” (“Venus”). 8002 has been on display at the Museum of the Three Revolutions since its construction, while 8001 is in regular service.

At least 15 North Korean M62 locomotives were converted to electric locomotives by Kim Chŏng-tae Electric Locomotive Works in 1998. This is presumed to be quite easy, as the overhead voltage in North Korea is 3000 V. Numbered 1.5-01 to 1.5-15, these are known as the Kanghaenggun-class (강행군, "Forced March").

Germany BR 120
A total of 396 locomotives were sent to East Germany between 1966 and 1978, most of which ended up at the Deutsche Reichsbahn with some being delivered to East German industry. The Reichsbahn used the M62 locomotives at first under the designation V 200, while later reclassifying those units as BR 120.

After the reunification of Germany and subsequent merger of the Deutsche Reichsbahn into the Bundesbahn the class designation was changed to BR 220 for the Deutsche Bundesbahn, as the original class number was already in use for the electric BR 120, and class designation ranges 100-199 were reserved for electric locomotives under the Bundesbahn's scheme. However, they were quickly phased out and by the end of 1994 the class had all but disappeared, with 31 units from Germany having been sold to North Korea.

Czechoslovakia and the Czech Republic class 781

Between 1966 and 1979 a total of 599 locomotives were imported into Czechoslovakia where at first they were given a T679.1 designation for standard-gauge locomotives and T679.5 for broad-gauge machines. Later in 1988 those numbers were changed to 781 and 781.8 respectively. Those machines were working in the Czech Republic and Slovakia until 2002.

Hungary M62

From 1965 till 1978 the Hungarian State Railways MÁV received 294 locomotives named M62. The M62 001 was actually the first M62 ever built, and is still running. The M62 designation and creation of the type originates from the MÁV order, as the Hungarian railways previously ordered Swedish Nohab locomotives called class M61 in MÁV service.

A program to replace the original, very outdated two-stroke Kolomna 14D40 power plants with a modern, more efficient engine was started in 1997, with the first locomotive, M62 301 debuting in early 2001. M62 301, 303 and 304 received MTU, the rest Caterpillar power plants. The program also included a thorough overhaul of the locomotives, including fitting better equipment for the driver, air conditioning, improved electrical system, etc. The 34 remotorized locomotives (M62 301–335) have been renamed M62.3 and received the nicknames "Remot-Szergej" for remotorized Szergej, "Csendes" meaning quiet, as well as "Csörgős" because of the rattling sound made by the engine.

Between 1970 and 1978, MÁV purchased 15 locomotives M62.5 with bogies for the Russian  broad gauge. Three more M62.5
have been rebuilt from standard gauge M62. The broad-gauge engines are used for operation near Zahony in the border region of the former Soviet Union (now Ukraine). In 2005 still seven M62.5 have been in use.

1972 also the Raab-Oedenburg-Ebenfurther Eisenbahn (Győr-Sopron-Ebenfurti Vasút, GySEV), an Austro-Hungarian joint venture, received six standard-gauge locomotives named M62.9. The locomotives were stationed in Sopron but were scrapped in 1996.

Cuba class M-62K
Twenty locomotives, named M-62K class were shipped to Cuba between 1974 and 1975 and subsequently used by the Ferrocarriles de Cuba. The "K" designation comes after the Russian spelling of the name Cuba, "Куба".

Though most of these machines are no longer in service on the island, one of them, numbered 61602 is on display at the National Railroad Museum in Havana. This one was driven by Fidel Castro on the inauguration of a tram between Cumbre and Placetas in the center of the country. Other surviving M-62Ks have been spotted in the central city of Cienfuegos; these are numbered 61611 and 61605. (See photo here:)

Mongolia M62
From 1980 till 1990 MTZ received 13 single units M62UM and 66 twin units 2M62M.

Technical data

Overview
The M62 locomotive has a Co-Co wheel arrangement, running on two bogies with three axles on each bogie. Chassis and bogie frames are constructed out of box elements. The two-stroke diesel engine and the main alternator are mounted on a steel frame. The frame is fixed to the chassis with elastic supports. Electric traction motors are mounted on bogie frames with a tram system. M62 is equipped with electro-pneumatic multiple-unit controls; therefore it is possible to drive two locomotives from one cab.

Comparison with M61
In Hungarian service, the M62 proved inferior to the Swedish-American NOHAB M61, which, while 10 tons lighter and slightly less powerful, could haul 25% more weight with 50-60% of the Soviet engine's fuel consumption. The M62 was unable to run from Budapest to Nyíregyháza and back without refueling, which led to congestion and timetable problems when the NOHAB was replaced by the M62 on that route.

Engines
The M62's 14D40 V diesel engine was unreliable because it was developed in a short timeframe from scratch, without previous design experience. In the 1950s domestically built Soviet diesel locomotives, having the wider  track base and taller tunnel clearances, used vertical opposed-piston engines. These (e.g. Kharkov 2D100/9D100/10D100) were based on the Fairbanks-Morse 38D8 design which was installed by F-M in their H15-44 Hood and H20-44 Hood road switcher locomotives, as well as the F-M 'Erie-Built' Passenger and Freight cab units. The Soviet opposed-piston engines, like their US counterparts, were simply too tall to fit in locomotives designed for the  standard-gauge railways with the tighter tunnel allowances of Eastern Bloc satellite countries. After the fall of the Soviet Bloc, 31 units of MÁV's M62 fleet were rebuilt with Caterpillar engines in the 1990s, but lack of funds stopped further upgrades.

No train heating
The M62 was a dedicated freight mover and lacked any carriage heating or power supply equipment, even though most Soviet satellite-state customers needed to use them in dual cargo/passenger role regularly (Soviet trains of the era were heated with individual per-coach drum fireplaces). In cold times a dedicated heating wagon had to be added to MÁV's M62-drawn trains, producing steam from oil-fired boilers (1960-70s era), later on generating electricity for electric heating (1980s era). This proved to be a costly solution, in contrast to the M61 NOHAB, which could produce 750 kg of steam per hour using an internal water tank and engine waste heat, with minimal effects on fuel consumption.

Nicknames
This locomotive has a certain cult following among railfans, and is referred to by several nicknames, usually derived from its Soviet provenance:
 Gagarin in Poland – from the space flight pioneer
 Iwan/Ivan or Siergiej/Sergej in Poland or Czechoslovakia – from two popular Russian names
 Szergej in Hungary – from a popular Russian name
 Taigatrommel (Taiga drum) in Germany – from the amount of noise and vibration the locomotive, the first locomotives was exported to the GDR without exhaust silencers.
 Stalin's last revenge in Germany – for the same reason.
 Mukha ( = fly) in Belarus.
 Sinsŏng ( = Nova) in North Korea.
 In the Soviet Union the locomotive had one widespread nickname – Mashka (diminutive of Maria, a reference to the "M" designation).

See also
 The Museum of the Moscow Railway, at Paveletsky Rail Terminal, Moscow
 Rizhsky Rail Terminal, Moscow, Home of the Moscow Railway Museum
 Varshavsky Rail Terminal, Saint Petersburg, Home of the Central Museum of Railway Transport, Russian Federation
 History of rail transport in Russia

Resources 

Railway locomotives introduced in 1965
M62
M62
M62
Voroshilovgrad Luhansk locomotives
Diesel-electric locomotives of Hungary
Locomotives of North Korea
5 ft gauge locomotives
Standard gauge locomotives of Poland
Standard gauge locomotives of North Korea
Standard gauge locomotives of Hungary
Standard gauge locomotives of Germany
Standard gauge locomotives of Czechoslovakia
Standard gauge locomotives of the Czech Republic
Standard gauge locomotives of Cuba
Diesel-electric locomotives of Germany
Diesel-electric locomotives of the Czech Republic
Diesel-electric locomotives of Czechoslovakia
Co′Co′ locomotives
Freight locomotives

cs:MÁV řada M62
hu:MÁV M62